The Meduncook River is a  river in Knox County, Maine. From its source in Friendship, the river runs about 1 mile south to the head of its estuary, then about 6 miles southwest to Muscongus Bay. 
The estuary forms part of the border between Friendship and Cushing.

See also
List of rivers of Maine

References

Maine Streamflow Data from the USGS
Maine Watershed Data From Environmental Protection Agency

Rivers of Knox County, Maine
Rivers of Maine